Joe "Nip" McKnight (December 4, 1933 - February 20, 2023) is an American politician who represented Tennessee's 27th district in the state senate from 1987–1995.

Early life
McKnight grew up in Bemis, Tennessee, a company town run by the Bemis Company that merged into the city of Jackson in 1977. His father, a former college basketball player at University of Tennessee-Martin, taught McKnight the game at a young age. He continued playing throughout high school and college, first for Memphis State University before transferring to UT-Martin, where McKnight broke his father's scoring record. After graduation, McKnight taught at South Side High School in Jackson for two years. He was then hired by Martin-Marietta Ammunition of Milan and served as the company's production superintendent for sixteen years.

Political career
McKnight served as Madison County commissioner for eight years prior to winning the 1986 state senate election. He defeated Bobby Carter in the tight 1990 election, but lost to Carter four years later.

Personal
McKnight married Sandra Maddox in 1960.

McKnight died on February 20, 2023.

References

1933 births
Tennessee state senators
People from Jackson, Tennessee
Schoolteachers from Tennessee
UT Martin Skyhawks men's basketball players
Memphis Tigers men's basketball players
County commissioners in Tennessee
Living people
People from Madison County, Tennessee
American men's basketball players